Char Fasson is an upazila of Bhola District in the Division of Barisal, Bangladesh.

Geography
Char Fasson Upazila has area of 1440.04 km2, located in between 21°54' and 22°16' north latitudes and in between 90°34' and 90°50' east longitudes. It is bounded by Lalmohan Upazila on the north, Bay of Bengal on the south, Manpura Upazila, Shahbazpur Channel and Bay of Bengal on the east, Dashmina and Galachipa Upazilas on the west. There are more than 100 islands in the upazila. Among them are Char Kukri Mukri, Dhal Char, and Char Nizam.

Demographics
According to the 1991 Bangladesh census, Char Fasson had a population of 342,038. Males constituted 51.49% of the population, and females 48.51%. The population aged 18 or over was 148,319. Char Fasson had an average literacy rate of 25.5% (7+ years), compared to the national average of 32.4%.

Arts and culture 
There are 15 clubs, 1 Library, 6 cinema hall, 4 theatre group and 1 stadium.

Points of tourism Place

 Jakob Tower
 Fashion Square, Char Fasson
 Char Kukri Mukri
 Taruya Sea beach
 Charfasson Eid Gah
 Charfasson BM. Town-Hall
 Maya Bridge 
 Charfasson Binodon Park
 Betuya launch ghat
 Ministry khamar Bari
 Char Kajur Gachiya
 Dakshin Aicha Thana
 Charfasson Bus Terminal
 Charfasson Samraj Gat
 Five Kopat Gat
 Char Patila 
 Char Sondip

Administration
Char Fasson Thana, now an upazila, was formed in 1970.

The Upazila is divided into Char Fasson Municipality and 19 union parishads: Abubakarpur, Abdullapur, Aminabad, Aslampur, Awajpur, Char Kolmi, Char Madras, Char Manika, Dhal Char, Hazarigonj, Jahanpur, Jinnaghar, Kukri Mukri, Mujib Nagar, Nazrul Nagar, Nilkamal, Nurabad, Rasulpur, and Osmanganj. The union parishads are subdivided into 68 mauzas and 77 villages.

Char Fasson Municipality is subdivided into 9 wards and 9 mahallas.

Religious institutions 
There are 601 mosques and 5 temples in Char Fasson Upazila.

Communication facilities
Roads
 Paved road = 96.80 km
 Semi-paved road = 50 km
 Mud road = 516.32 km.

Education

There are eight colleges in the upazila. They include Char Fasson Govt. College, Dular Hat Adarsha Degree College, Fatema Matin Mohila College, founded in 1993, and Rasulpur Degree College.

According to Banglapedia, Charfassion Govt T Barret Model Secondary School, founded 1932, is a notable secondary school in the upazila.

The madrasa education system includes eight Fazil and two Kamil madrasas. According to Banglapedia, Charfassion Karamatia Kamil Madrasah, founded in 1945, is a notable Kamil madrasa and Hazari Gonj Hamidia Fazil Madrasah is a notable Fazil madrasa

Media
Weekly
Fasson Barta (Defunct), Upakul Barta, Pratham Akash.

See also
Upazilas of Bangladesh
Districts of Bangladesh
Divisions of Bangladesh

References

 
Upazilas of Bhola District